Species recorded on Caroline Island, one of the Line Islands in the south-central Pacific Ocean:

Flora

Trees

 Calophyllum
 Cocos nucifera
 Cordia subcordata
 Hibiscus tiliaceus
 Morinda citrifolia

 Pandanus tectorius
 Pisonia grandis
 Thespesia populnea

Shrubs

 Heliotropium foertherianum
 Scaevola taccada
 Suriana maritima
 Ximenia americana

Herbs

 Achyranthes canscens
 Boerhavia repens
 Heliotropium anomalum
 Ipomoea macrantha
 Ipomoea violacea
 Laportea ruderalis
 Lepidium bidentatum
 Lepturus repens
 Lygodium microphyllum
 Phyllanthus amarus
 Phymatosorus scolopendria
 Portulaca lutea
 Psilotum nudum
 Sida fallax
 Tacca leontopetaloides
 Tribulus cistoides

Fauna

Nesting seabirds

 Black noddy (Anous minutus)
 Blue-grey noddy (Procelsterna cerulea) (Kepler)
 Brown booby (Sula leucogaster)
 Brown noddy (Anous stolidus)
 Great frigatebird (Fregata minor)
 Lesser frigatebird (Fregata ariel)
 Masked booby (Sula dactylatra)
 Red-footed booby (Sula sula)
 Red-tailed tropicbird (Phaethon rubricauda) (Kepler)

 Sooty tern (Onychoprion fuscata)
 White tern (Gygis alba)

Other birds

 Bristle-thighed curlew (Numenius tahitiensis)

 Lesser golden-plover (Pluvialis dominica) (Kepler)
 Long-tailed cuckoo (Eudynamis taitensis)
 Pacific golden plover (Pluvialis fulva)
 Reef heron (Egretta sacra) (Kepler)
 Ruddy turnstone (Arenaria interpres) (Kepler)
 Sanderling (Crocethia alba) (Kepler)
Short-eared owl (Asio flammeus ponapensis) 
 Wandering tattler (Tringa incana)

Lizards

 Azure-tailed skink (Emoia cyanura) (Kepler)
 Emoia impar (Kepler)
 Moth skink (Lipinia noctua) (Kepler)
 Mourning gecko (Lepidodactylus lugubris) (Kepler)
 Polynesian gecko (Gehyra oceanica) (Kepler)

 Snake-eyed skink (Cryptoblepharus poecilopleurus) (Kepler)

Mammals

 Pacific bottlenose dolphin (Tursiops gilli) (Kepler)
 Polynesian rat (Rattus exulans) (Kepler)

Turtles

 Green sea turtle (Chelonia mydas)

Crabs
 Coconut crab (Birgus largo)
 Red spotted crab (Carpilius maculatus) (Kepler)
 Scarlet crab (Cornobita perlatus) (Kepler)

Polychaetes
 Calcareous tubeworm (Serpula tetratropia)

Notes

References
 

Species
Flora of Micronesia
Flora of the south-central Pacific
Lists of biota of Kiribati
Lists of plants
Lists of animals by location
Oceanian realm flora
Oceanian realm fauna
Caroline Island